KAXL (88.3 FM) is a radio station broadcasting a Contemporary Inspirational format. Licensed to Greenacres, California, United States, the station serves the Bakersfield area.  The station is owned by Skyride Unlimited, Inc., and features programming from AP Radio.

References

External links

AXL
Radio stations established in 1994
1994 establishments in California
AXL